Rômulo Noronha (born February 4, 1987 in Caxias do Sul), or simply Rômulo, is a Brazilian defensive midfielder.

Career

Flamengo
Rômulo played few matches for the club in 2005 and 2006, but in the year of 2007 he had his first real chances in the first team, with coach Joel Santana. He played in the Campeonato Brasileiro Série A 2007 17 matches, all of them as a starter.

Injury and loan to Paraná
Although, in a derby match against Vasco da Gama he suffered a serious injury, a rupture in the knee ligaments and had been out of action for six months. Rômulo returned in the first half of the 2008 season. Out of coach Caio Júnior's plans he was loaned to Paraná and played in the Brazilian Série B until the end of 2008.

Figueirense
In 2009 Rômulo had a five month loan on Figueirense, he had six appearances, including two matches on Copa do Brasil.

Career statistics
(Correct )

according to combined sources on the Flamengo official website and Flaestatística.

In 2008 Rômulo played for Paraná in the Brazilian Série B.
1 Including 1 match in the Campeonato Carioca 
2 Including 2 matches in the Campeonato Carioca 
3 Including 4 matches in the Campeonato Catarinense 
4 Including 1 match in the Campeonato Carioca 
5 Including 2 matches in the Campeonato Carioca

References

External links
 
 CBF 
 

1987 births
Living people
Brazilian footballers
CR Flamengo footballers
Paraná Clube players
Figueirense FC players
Atlético Clube Goianiense players
Campeonato Brasileiro Série A players
Association football midfielders